General Sir Mark Walker  (24 November 1827 – 18 July 1902) was a British Army officer and an Irish recipient of the Victoria Cross, the highest award for gallantry in the face of the enemy that can be awarded to British and Commonwealth forces.

Early life
Walker was born in Gore Port, Finea, County Westmeath in Ireland, the son of Captain Alexander Walker and Elizabeth Elliott. His younger brother was Sir Samuel Walker, 1st Baronet QC, Liberal MP for Londonderry, Solicitor-General for Ireland, Attorney-General for Ireland and Lord Chancellor of Ireland.

Victoria Cross

During the Crimean War, Walker was a 26-year-old lieutenant in the 30th Regiment of Foot (later the East Lancashire Regiment) British Army when the deed for which he was awarded the VC was performed.

His Victoria Cross was until recently on display at The Buffs Regimental Museum, Canterbury, England. With the rest of that museum's collections, it has now been transferred to the National Army Museum, where it is not currently on display.

Later life
He was wounded by a howitzer shell during his service in the Crimea which resulted in the amputation of his right arm.  He served through the Second Anglo-Chinese War of 1860 as brigade major, and in 1861 he received the rank of lieutenant-colonel. Promotion to colonel followed in 1869, and from 1875 to 1879 he commanded a brigade in Madras, during which he was promoted to major-general in 1878. From 1883 to 1884 he was at Aldershot, then in command of a brigade at Gibraltar until 1888, when he was promoted lieutenant-general. He retired from the army with the rank of general in 1893, and was appointed a Knight Commander of the Order of the Bath.

From 1900 until his death he was colonel of the Sherwood Foresters.

He died at Arlington, Devon, England on 18 July 1902.

A memorial wall plaque honouring Sir Mark is found at Canterbury Cathedral.

Personal life
In 1881 Walker married Catherine Chichester.

References

List of Irish Victoria Cross recipients
The Register of the Victoria Cross

 Ireland's VCs  (Dept of Economic Development, 1995)
Monuments to Courage (David Harvey, 1999)
Irish Winners of the Victoria Cross (Richard Doherty & David Truesdale, 2000)

External links
Location of grave and VC medal (Kent)

1827 births
1902 deaths
19th-century Irish people
Irish officers in the British Army
People from County Westmeath
Crimean War recipients of the Victoria Cross
Irish recipients of the Victoria Cross
British Army personnel of the Crimean War
British Army personnel of the Second Opium War
30th Regiment of Foot officers
British Army generals
Knights Commander of the Order of the Bath
Buffs (Royal East Kent Regiment) officers
British amputees
British Army recipients of the Victoria Cross
Burials in Kent
Military personnel from County Westmeath